Leonardo Martín "Cuny" Proverbio (born November 14, 1989) is an Argentine ski mountaineer and mountain climber

Proverbio was born in San Carlos de Bariloche. He studied tourism at Universidad FASTA, Mar del Plata, and lives in San Carlos de Bariloche.

He has won all South American championships of ski mountaineering since the first edition in 2005.

MANASLU Nepal 8.163 mts ... SKI 7300 mts 50% inclination alone without Sherpa ...  SKI jump backflyp 6000 masl.  highest SKI backflyp world record

Selected results 
 2005: 1st, South American Championship, individual
 2007: 1st, South American Championship, individual
 2009: 1st, South American Championship, individual
2006: Intento al Broad Peak de 8047 metros. sin cima
 2010: Monte Everest cima 23 mayo 8:13 am Himalaya
 2011: ascención en solitario de una montaña virgen de 6000 metros en la lejana región de Hunza Pakistán, . 3 intentos al Nanga Parbat 8125 metros por la cara Diamir. 2 intentos a la arista del Mazeno abriendo dos itinerarios uno sobre roca y otro sobre hielo llegando apenas a 500 metros de altura de la cima.

References 

 https://vimeo.com/50374228

External links 
 Leonardo Proverbio at SkiMountaineering.org

1979 births
Living people
Sportspeople from Bariloche
Argentine people of Italian descent
Argentine male ski mountaineers
Argentine mountain climbers
American summiters of Mount Everest